Vas-Palnik is a rural locality (a village) in Beloyevskoye Rural Settlement, Kudymkarsky District, Perm Krai, Russia. The population was 2 as of 2010.

Geography 
Vas-Palnik is located 15 km northwest of Kudymkar (the district's administrative centre) by road. Minyadyn is the nearest rural locality.

References 

Rural localities in Kudymkarsky District